Kupinovo is a village located in the municipality of Pećinci, Serbia. As of 2011 census, the village has 1,866 inhabitants.

It is near the famous biodiversity area, the Obedska bara. This contains several insects and other life forms unique to the area.

Name

In Serbian, the village is known as Kupinovo (Купиново), formerly also Kupinik; in Croatian as Kupinovo; and in Hungarian as Kölpény or Kelpény. The name of the village derived from Serbian word "kupina" ("blackberry" in English).

History

In the Middle Ages, Kupinik was a notable city and was a residence of Serbian despots in Syrmia in the 15th and 16th century.

Demographics
As of 2011 census results, them village has 1,866 inhabitants.

Historical population
 1961: 2,220
 1971: 2,057
 1981: 2,002
 1991: 2,009
 2002: 2,047
 2011: 1,866

Notable residents
 Miki Đuričić, reality TV star

See also
 List of places in Serbia
 List of cities, towns and villages in Vojvodina

References
 Slobodan Ćurčić, Broj stanovnika Vojvodine, Novi Sad, 1996.

External links

Populated places in Syrmia
Populated places in Srem District
Pećinci
Spatial Cultural-Historical Units of Great Importance